Coeloides is a genus of insects belonging to the family Braconidae.

The species of this genus are found in Europe, Southern Africa and Northern America.

Species:
 Coeloides abdominalis (Zetterstedt, 1838) 
 Coeloides armandi Dang & Yang, 1985

References

Braconidae
Braconidae genera